Liberty Township is a township in Marion County, Kansas, United States.  As of the 2010 census, the township population was 320, not including the city of Hillsboro.

Geography

Cities and towns
The township contains the following settlements:
 City of Hillsboro (south of D Street). The north part is located in Risley Township.
 Ghost town of Gnadenau.

Cemeteries
The township contains the following cemeteries:
 Alexanderfeld Cemetery (a.k.a. Church of God in Christ Cemetery), located in Section 4 T20S R2E.
 Ebenfeld Mennonite Brethren Church Cemetery, located in Section 25 T20S R2E.
 Gard Cemetery, located in Section 24 T20S R2E.
 Gnadenau Church Cemetery #1 (There are no stones, records are in Library at Tabor College), located in Section 11 T20S R2E.
 Gnadenau Church Cemetery #2 (a.k.a. Parkview Cemetery) (a.k.a. Grace Meadow Cemetery), located in Section 9 T20S R2E.
 Haven of Rest Cemetery (includes Ebenezer of Bruderthal and First Mennonite sections), located in Section 2 T20S R2E.
 Hope Valley Cemetery, located in Section 17 T20S R2E.
 Jost Cemetery, located in Section 5 T20S R2E.
 Mennonite Brethren Church Cemetery of Hillsboro, located in Section 3 T20S R2E.
 Salem Orphan's Home Cemetery, located in Section 2 T20S R2E.

Transportation
No major highways or railroads pass through the township.

References

Further reading

External links
 Marion County website
 City-Data.com
 Marion County maps: Current, Historic, KDOT

Townships in Marion County, Kansas
Townships in Kansas